"Way Back into Love" is a pop song written by Adam Schlesinger, from the 2007 Warner Bros. Pictures film Music and Lyrics. There are two versions of the song: a demo version performed by Grant and Drew Barrymore and the final version performed by Hugh Grant and Haley Bennett. It was used as the love theme in the film, much of whose plot revolves around the writing and arranging of the song.

Music video
The song's music video features Hugh Grant and Drew Barrymore singing the demo version. It also shows some clips from the film.

Charts
Despite the fact that the song was not released as a single, it managed to chart in some Asian countries.

References

External links
  Way Back into Love YouTube
 Way Back into Love (Demo Version) YouTube

2006 songs
2007 singles
Male–female vocal duets
Hugh Grant songs
Songs written by Adam Schlesinger
Songs written for films
Atlantic Records singles